The 2017–18 Perth Scorchers Women's season was the third in the team's history. Coached by Lisa Keightley and captained by Elyse Villani, the Scorchers ended the regular season of WBBL03 in third place. They then defeated the Sydney Thunder by 27 runs in a semi-final at Optus Stadium to set up a re-match of the previous year's final against the Sydney Sixers. In the championship decider, held at Adelaide Oval, the Scorchers suffered a heavy nine-wicket loss to once again finish the tournament as runners-up.

Squad
Each WBBL|03 squad featured 15 active players, with an allowance of up to five marquee signings including a maximum of three from overseas. Australian marquees were defined as players who made at least ten limited-overs appearances for the national team in the three years prior to the cut-off date (24 April 2017).

Personnel changes ahead of the season included:

 New Zealand marquee Suzie Bates departed the Scorchers, signing with the Adelaide Strikers.
 Meg Lanning signed with the Scorchers, departing the Melbourne Stars. However, due to a shoulder injury, Lanning would be unavailable for the entire season. New Zealand's Thamsyn Newton was subsequently signed as a marquee replacement player.
 Due to the departure of Bates (outgoing captain with a 9–7 win–loss record) and the unavailability of Lanning, Elyse Villani assumed the captaincy for the season.
 England marquee Nat Sciver signed with the Scorchers, departing the Melbourne Stars.
 Mikayla Hinkley signed with the Scorchers, departing the Sydney Thunder.

Changes made during the season included the signing of Taneale Peschel as a local replacement player. Peschel played two games in the absence of Katherine Brunt who was sidelined with a back injury.

The table below lists the Scorchers players and their key stats (including runs scored, batting strike rate, wickets taken, economy rate, catches and stumpings) for the season.

Ladder

Fixtures
All times are local time

Regular season

{{Single-innings cricket match|date=26 December 2017|venue=WACA Ground, Perth|rain=|notes=Streamed on cricket.com.au
 Double header with Match 7 of the Men's BBL|result=Perth Scorchers won by 9 wickets (with 9 balls remaining)|report=Scorecard|umpires=Ashlee Kovalevs and John Taylor|motm=Nicole Bolton (Scorchers)|toss=Perth Scorchers won the toss and elected to field|wickets2=Erin Osborne 1/24 (4 overs)|time=11:20|runs2=Elyse Villani 84* (53)|score2=1/164 (18.3 overs)|team2=Perth Scorchers|wickets1=Emma King 2/24 (4 overs)|runs1=Lizelle Lee 76 (62)|score1=4/163 (20 overs)|team1=Melbourne Stars|round= Match 17|bg=#CCFFCC}}

Knockout phase

 Statistics and awards 

 Most runs: Elyse Villani – 535 (2nd in the league) Highest score in an innings: Elyse Villani – 84* (53) vs Melbourne Stars, 26 December 2017
 Most wickets: Katherine Brunt – 23 (equal 1st in the league) Best bowling figures in an innings: Katherine Brunt – 3/11 (4 overs) vs Melbourne Renegades, 28 January 2018
 Most catches (fielder): Nat Sciver – 13 (1st in the league)''
 Player of the Match awards:
 Nicole Bolton, Elyse Villani – 3 each
 Katherine Brunt, Emma King, Nat Sciver – 1 each
 Scorchers Player of the Year: Katherine Brunt
 WBBL|03 Player of the Tournament: Elyse Villani (2nd)
 WBBL|03 Team of the Tournament: Nicole Bolton, Katherine Brunt, Elyse Villani

References

2017–18 Women's Big Bash League season by team
Perth Scorchers (WBBL)